David Alan Low (5 February 1911 – 22 October 1974) was a railway clerk and member of the Queensland Legislative Assembly.

Biography
Low was born in Yandina, Queensland, to parents John Anthony Low and his wife Louisa Ann (née Bury) and was educated at Nambour State School, Yandina Rural School, and Nambour High Schools. He became a railway clerk at Nambour, Yandina, Kingaroy and Maryborough.

In 1939 he married Claudia Helen Ritchie and together they had one daughter. His interests included fishing, surfing, and lawn bowls. He was a member of the Maroochy Masonic Lodge and the Nambour Bowls Club.

David Low Way, a 36 kilometre stretch of road that joins coastal townships of the Sunshine Coast is named in his honour. He died in Brisbane in 1974, six days after resigning his seat in parliament.

Political career
Low, for the Country Party, was the member for Cooroora in the Queensland Legislative Assembly from 1947 until 1974. He was also Chairman of the Maroochy Shire Council from 1952 until 1967.

References

47

Members of the Queensland Legislative Assembly
1911 births
1974 deaths
20th-century Australian politicians
National Party of Australia members of the Parliament of Queensland